Usenko is a gender-neutral Ukrainian surname. It may refer to:

 Ivan Usenko (born 1983), Belarusian ice hockey player
 Matvei Usenko, Soviet major general
 Nadiya Usenko (born 2000), Ukrainian squash player
 Nikolai Usenko (1924–1996), Soviet soldier
 Olena Usenko (born 2007), Ukrainian singer
 Zhanna Usenko-Chorna (born 1973), Ukrainian lawyer

See also
 

Ukrainian-language surnames